ICF Stand Up Paddling World Championships is an International Canoe Federation competition in stand up paddling (SUP) in which athletes compete in technical and sprint races. The event is held annually and was first contested in 2019. There is a rival world championships in SUP held by the International Surf Association.

Editions 
 2019:  Qingdao, China
 2020: Cancelled (COVID-19)
 2021:  Balatonfured, Hungary
 2022:  Gdynia, Poland

Medalists

Men

Technical race

Sprint

Long distance

Inflatable SUP

Women

Technical race

Sprint

Long distance

Inflatable SUP

References

 

Stand Up Paddling